Lovestoned is a German-Swedish pop band from Stockholm. They took part in the 2010 Melodifestivalen.

Singles

References

External links 

 Official website (Expired)

Musical groups established in 2009
German pop music groups
Swedish pop music groups
Melodifestivalen contestants of 2010